Pepsi NFL Rookie of the Week is an award given to the best performing rookie players in the National Football League (NFL). It was first awarded in 2002 and is sponsored by Pepsi. Winners are chosen among five finalists every week during the season by an online vote on the NFL's official website. Total votes by the end of the season are used to determine the five finalists for the Pepsi NFL Rookie of the Year award. The award is sometimes named after other varieties of Pepsi, such as Diet Pepsi and Pepsi Zero.

Winners

2000s

2002

2003

2004

2005

2006

2007

2008

2009

2010s

2010

2011

2012

2013

2014

2015

2016

2017

2018

2019

2020s

2020

2021

2022

See also
Pepsi NFL Rookie of the Year

References

External links
Official website

National Football League trophies and awards
Rookie player awards